O'Kane Glacier is a steep glacier, 15 nautical miles (28 km) long, draining the east wall of Eisenhower Range between Mount Baxter and Eskimo Point and flowing southeast to its terminus opposite the mouths of the Priestley and Corner Glaciers at the north extremity of Nansen Ice Sheet, in Victoria Land. Named by Advisory Committee on Antarctic Names (US-ACAN) in association with O'Kane Canyon, located at the head of the glacier.

The south wall of the glacier is a series of rugged crags descending southeast from Mount Baxter, called the Simpson Crags. They were mapped by the United States Geological Survey (USGS) from surveys and U.S. Navy air photos, 1955–63. They were named by US-ACAN for Lieutenant Commander William A. Simpson, Jr., U.S. Navy, aircraft commander with Squadron VX-6 during U.S. Navy Operation Deepfreeze 1967.

References 

Glaciers of Victoria Land
Scott Coast